The Portrait of Cardinal Bibbiena is a portrait of Cardinal Bernardo Dovizi da Bibbiena (pope Leo X's private secretary) by Raphael, painted around 1516 and now in the Palazzo Pitti in Florence. Its rendering appears more rigid than is usual for Raphael, leading some critics to attribute it to one of his pupils or to feel it is possibly a copy from a lost autograph original.

See also
List of paintings by Raphael

Notes

References

External links
http://www.wga.hu/frames-e.html?/html/r/raphael/5roma/3/04bibbie.html

Bibbiena
1516 paintings